Homonota horrida, also known as South American marked gecko, is a species of gecko. It lives in Argentina and Paraguay.

References

Homonota
Reptiles of Argentina
Reptiles of Paraguay
Reptiles described in 1861
Taxa named by Hermann Burmeister